Sébastien Chenu (born 13 April 1973) is a French politician serving as the member of the National Assembly for the 19th constituency of Nord since 2017. A former member of the Union for a Popular Movement (UMP), he has also been a spokesman of the National Rally (RN, until 2018 named National Front) since 2017 under the leadership of Marine Le Pen. He is currently serving as vice-president of the French National Assembly.

Career
Openly homosexual, Chenu founded GayLib, then the LGBT wing of the Union for a Popular Movement (UMP), today part of the Union of Democrats and Independents (UDI). He joined the National Front (FN) after the UMP attempted to kill Law 2013-404, which legalised same-sex marriage, claiming that the UMP had become "the French Tea Party".

Chenu was a vice president of the Communauté d'agglomération du Beauvaisis from 2001 to 2014, when he served as a deputy to Mayor Caroline Cayeux of Beauvais. Since 2016, he has been a regional councillor of Hauts-de-France. In the 2017 legislative election, he was elected to the National Assembly in the 19th constituency of Nord.

For the 2021 regional election, Chenu was chosen to lead the National Rally list in Hauts-de-France.

References

1973 births
Living people
People from Beauvais
Politicians from Hauts-de-France
Deputies of the 15th National Assembly of the French Fifth Republic
LGBT legislators in France
National Rally (France) politicians
Gay politicians
French LGBT rights activists
LGBT conservatism